The 1935 United Kingdom general election was held on Thursday 14 November 1935 and resulted in a large, albeit reduced, majority for the National Government now led by Stanley Baldwin of the Conservative Party. The greatest number of members, as before, were Conservatives, while the National Liberal vote held steady. The much smaller National Labour vote also held steady but the resurgence in the main Labour vote caused over a third of their MPs, including National Labour leader Ramsay MacDonald, to lose their seats.

Labour, under what was then regarded internally as the caretaker leadership of Clement Attlee following the resignation of George Lansbury slightly over a month before, made large gains over their very poor showing at the 1931 general election, and saw their highest share of the vote yet. They made a net gain of over a hundred seats, thus reversing much of the ground lost in 1931. The Liberals continued a slow political decline, with their leader, Sir Herbert Samuel, losing his seat.

The Independent Labour Party stood entirely separately from Labour for the first time since 1895, having stood candidates unendorsed by Labour at the 1931 general election and having disaffiliated fully from Labour in 1932. The Scottish National Party contested their first general election, and the Communist Party gained the West Fife seat, their first in ten years. Major election issues were stubborn unemployment and the role of the League of Nations, particularly regarding the Empire of Japan. Parliament was dissolved on 25 October.

No general elections were held during the Second World War until Allied victory was assured via acts of Parliament; hence the 1935 House sat until 1945. This parliament would see two leadership changes. Neville Chamberlain took over from Stanley Baldwin as Prime Minister and Tory Leader in 1937. He in turn resigned in 1940 in favour of Winston Churchill, who led the three main parties in Parliament in government for the war.

This was the last election to be held during the reign of George V, who would die two months after the election.

Results

|colspan=12 bgcolor=#E0E0E0 align="center"|National Government
|-

|- 
|colspan=1 bgcolor=#000000 align="left"|
|colspan=1 bgcolor=#efefef align="left"| National Government (total)
|colspan=1 bgcolor=#efefef align="right"| Stanley Baldwin
|colspan=1 bgcolor=#efefef align="right"| 583
|colspan=1 bgcolor=#efefef align="right"| 429
|colspan=1 bgcolor=#efefef align="right"| 12
|colspan=1 bgcolor=#efefef align="right"| 139
|colspan=1 bgcolor=#efefef align="right"| −125
|colspan=1 bgcolor=#efefef align="right"| 69.8
|colspan=1 bgcolor=#efefef align="right"| 51.8
|colspan=1 bgcolor=#efefef align="right"| 11,183,908
|colspan=1 bgcolor=#efefef align="right"|−15.4
|-

|colspan=12 bgcolor=#E0E0E0 align="center"|Opposition
|-

|}

Votes summary

Seats summary

Transfers of seats
 All comparisons are with the 1931 election.
In some cases the change is due to the MP defecting to the gaining party. Such circumstances are marked with a *.
In other circumstances the change is due to the seat having been won by the gaining party in a by-election in the intervening years, and then retained in 1935. Such circumstances are marked with a †.

Constituency results
These are available on the Political Science Resources Elections Database, a link to which is given below.

See also
List of MPs elected in the 1935 United Kingdom general election
1935 United Kingdom general election in Northern Ireland

References

Further reading

Manifestos
1935 Conservative manifesto
1935 Labour manifesto
1935 Liberal manifesto

 
1935
General election
November 1935 events
General Election
Clement Attlee
Stanley Baldwin